Toni Rose is a Democratic member of the Texas House of Representatives. She has represented District 110 since 2013.

References

External links
Legislative page
 Toni Rose at the Texas Tribune

Living people
Democratic Party members of the Texas House of Representatives
Politicians from Dallas
Paul Quinn College alumni
Women state legislators in Texas
21st-century American politicians
21st-century American women politicians
1968 births